María Belén Rueda García-Porrero (born 16 March 1965) is a Spanish actress. She became popular in Spain for her performances in the Globomedia-produced television series Periodistas (1998–2002) and, most notably, Los Serrano (2003–2007). Likewise, she has carved an international reputation among horror fans for her performances in horror and suspense works.

Biography 
María Belén Rueda García-Porrero was born in Madrid on 16 March 1965. Her father was a civil engineer and her mother was a ballet instructor. She is the second of three children; her siblings are named María Jesús and Alfonso. She and her family moved to San Juan, Alicante when she was a child. When Rueda was 18 years old she moved to Madrid to study architecture.

Career

While she had been already cast as the photographer Clara Nadal for the series Periodistas she was called to briefly play the same character of Clara Nadal in the popular dramedy Médico de familia (also produced by Globomedia) as a sort of emergency casting to cover a leave on absence, and thus the latter marked her debut as a television actress in 1997 (and both fictions became connected in the same fictional universe). She went then on to play the character of Clara Nadal in Periodistas from 1998 to 2002.

Starting in 2003 and over the course of six seasons and 107 episodes, Rueda performed the role of Lucía Gómez in the popular series Los Serrano, leaving the series in 2007 reportedly to focus on her stage career.

She landed her feature film debut with a performance in the 2004 film The Sea Inside, for which she won a Goya Award and an Actors Union Award to Best New Actress.

She received another Goya nomination for her role in the 2007 film, The Orphanage. Rueda played the lead role of the Spanish thriller Julia's Eyes, which was produced by Guillermo del Toro. She also starred in Oriol Paulo's thriller The Body.

Filmography

Awards and nominations

Personal life 
During the time of VIP Noche she entered a relationship with producer Daniel Écija, with whom she had 3 daughters, including actress Belén Écija. After 14 years of domestic partnership, she got married with Écija in 2003. The couple separated a year later.

She later was in a relationship with Roger Vincent.

References

External links

1965 births
Living people
Actresses from Madrid
Spanish film actresses
Spanish stage actresses
Spanish television actresses
Spanish television presenters
20th-century Spanish actresses
21st-century Spanish actresses
Spanish women television presenters